Enyalius erythroceneus is a species of lizard in the family Leiosauridae. It is native to Brazil.

References

Enyalius
Reptiles described in 2006
Reptiles of Brazil
Taxa named by Miguel Trefaut Rodrigues
Taxa named by Marco A. de Freitas
Taxa named by Thais F. Santos Silva